Pauli Arbarei is a comune (municipality) in the Province of South Sardinia on the Italian island of Sardinia, located about  northwest of Cagliari and about  north of Sanluri.

Pauli Arbarei borders the following municipalities: Las Plassas, Lunamatrona, Siddi, Tuili, Turri, Ussaramanna, Villamar. Economy is mostly based on agriculture and animal husbandry.

References

Cities and towns in Sardinia